Dimethylphosphite is an organophosphorus compound with the formula (CH3O)2P(O)H, known as dimethyl hydrogen phosphite (DMHP). Dimethylphosphite, is a minor tautomer of the phosphorus(V) derivative. It is a reagent for generating other organophosphorus compounds, exploiting the high reactivity of the P-H bond. The molecule is tetrahedral.  It is a colorless liquid.  The compounds can be prepared by methanolysis of phosphorus trichloride or by heating diethylphosphite in methanol.

Although studies have not been reported for this compound, the closely related diethylphosphite exists predominantly as the phosphorus(V) tautomer.

This tautomeric nature of DMHP made it desirable as a precursor to the G-series compounds, and it was the most successful among all other phosphonate precursors. The now obsolete process, which used it as a precursor, was called the DMHP process, investigated by Otto Ambros' team and implemented to scale sarin production.

References

Organophosphites